The 12th Central Committee of the Chinese Communist Party was in session from September 1982 to November 1987. It held seven plenary sessions.  It was securely succeeded by the 13th Central Committee.

It elected the 12th Politburo of the Chinese Communist Party in 1982.

It had 210 members and 138 alternate members.

List of members
The following is in stroke order of surnames:

Chronology
1st Plenary Session
Date: September 12–13, 1982
Location: Beijing
Significance: Hu Yaobang was elected General Secretary, with Zhao Ziyang as his No. 2 (though he was listed fourth among top leaders). 28-member Politburo, 6-member Politburo Standing Committee and 5-member Secretariat were elected. The Central Advisory Commission was established. Deng Xiaoping was elected chairman of both the Central Military Commission and the Central Advisory Commission. In his closing speech, he talked about the retirement of elder leaders.
2nd Plenary Session
Date: October 11–12, 1983
Location: Beijing
Significance: A Decision of the CCP Central Committee on the Rectification of Party Organizations was adopted in order to purge the Party from consequences of the Cultural Revolution. Around this time, the Anti-Spiritual Pollution Campaign was launched under Chen Yun's care. This was one of the few post-Mao meetings focused on ideological issues.
3rd Plenary Session
Date: October 20, 1984
Location: Beijing
Significance: A Decision of the CCP Central Committee on Economic Reform was adopted, fostering the new economic line pursued by Deng Xiaoping's leadership. A CCP National Conference on it was convened.
4th Plenary Session
Date: September 16, 1985
Location: Beijing
Significance: Recommendations for the 7th Five-Year Plan were adopted to be submitted to the Party's National Conference on September 20, and then to the National People's Congress with the goal of adapting national economy to the reform. Party veterans Ye Jianying and Huang Kecheng retired.
5th Plenary Session
Date: September 24, 1985
Location: Beijing
Significance: Meeting held after the September 20 National Conference. The leadership bodies of the Central Committee, the Central Advisory Commission and the Central Commission for Discipline Inspection were renewed. Li Peng entered the Politburo and the Secretariat.
6th Plenary Session
Date: September 28, 1986
Location: Beijing
Significance: A Resolution of the CCP Central Committee on the Building of the Socialist Spiritual Culture. The decision to convene the Party's 13th National Congress was taken.
7th Plenary Session
Date: September 28, 1987
Location: Beijing
Significance: Preparations for the Party's 13th National Congress were made. A plan for administration reform was adopted. Hu Yaobang resigned as General Secretary, and Zhao Ziyang was appointed acting General Secretary.

External links 
  12th Central Committee of the CCP, People's Daily Online.

Central Committee of the Chinese Communist Party
1982 establishments in China
1987 disestablishments in China